Mohela BL (Bi-Lateral) High School is a semi-government high school in Chatmohar of Pabna district in Bangladesh. 
The school is one of the oldest educational institution in Parshawdanga union parishad.
The school is also known as Mohela Uccha Viddalaya to local people. Around 600 students, including boys and girls, are currently studying at Mohela High School. Following demands to enroll more students, the school authorities opened four more class rooms in a new building.

Secondary School Certificate (SSC) 2008

150 students from Mohela High School scored average GPA 4.5 in 2008. A total of 90 students achieved first division from Rajshahi Education Board.

References

External links
 School website
 School list of Chatmohar

High schools in Bangladesh